Raga Tarangini or just Tarangini is the most prominent musical compositions of Narayana Teertha, the 17th century Carnatic music composer and the author of a Sanskrit opera called Sri Krishna Leela Tarangini. Tharangams  of the Krishna Leela Tharangini to which, it is believed, Lord Krishna danced. Tarangini is an opera highly suitable for dance drama and it has been very well utilized by Kuchipudi dancers over the last two centuries.

Compositions
Tarangini consists of 12 Tarangams and encapsulates 153 songs, 302 slokams and 31 choornikaas. Teertha followed Veda Vyasa’s Bhagavatam and concentrated on the 10th Skandam.

References

Carnatic music
17th century in music